The Santa Clara County Fire Department (SCCFD) provides fire protection and emergency medical services to the county of Santa Clara, California. Established in 1947, the SCCFD is responsible for the unincorporated areas of Santa Clara County as well as the communities of Campbell, Cupertino, Los Altos, Los Altos Hills, Los Gatos, Monte Sereno, and Saratoga.

In addition to their career firefighters, the department is also augmented by approximately 27 volunteer firefighters. Daily 24-hour emergency response staffing consists of 66 firefighters and officers operating out of 15 fire stations with 19 pieces of apparatus and 3 command vehicles.

History

Formation 
The Santa Clara County Fire Department is an all hazard department that has evolved through fire consolidations and contracts. In 1947, two agencies – the Cottage Grove Fire District and the Oakmead Farms Fire District – were consolidated to form the Santa Clara County Central Fire Protection District (a.k.a. Santa Clara County Fire Department). This consolidation was the result of the California Division of Forestry (a.k.a. CAL FIRE) withdrawing from the valley floor when its contract with Santa Clara County was terminated in 1947.

In that same year, an election was held which authorized the Department to provide fire suppression services to the unincorporated areas stretching from Highway 9 east across the valley to Mount Hamilton and south to the Almaden area.

In 1970, the Department consolidated with the Burbank Fire District and the Alma Fire District, and contracted with the Town of Los Gatos for fire protection services.

In 1977, the Department contracted with the cities of Campbell, Milpitas, San Jose, and Santa Clara to service portions of the Department referred to as “Zone 1.” The City of San Jose provides fire services for a vast majority of the unincorporated areas in the eastern part of County Fire. Five fire stations and assigned personnel ultimately transferred to the city. The “Zone 2” designation remains as the intrinsic service area for County Fire.

Prior to 1982, the Santa Clara County Fire Marshal's Office (FMO) operated as a Santa Clara County department. Following Proposition 13, this department was eliminated, and County Fire began its own Fire Prevention Division. In 1987, the Fire Chief of the Santa Clara County Fire Department was appointed to serve in the position of County Fire Marshal, and County Fire began providing fire marshal services to county facilities and unincorporated county areas.

In 1993, the City of Campbell; in 1995, the City of Morgan Hill; and in 1996, the City of Los Altos and the Los Altos Hills County Fire District contracted for fire services with the Department. Merging Campbell, Morgan Hill, and Los Altos personnel, facilities, and equipment into County Fire made the Department the second-largest fire agency in Santa Clara County. In 1997, for the 50-year service anniversary, the Department adopted the also known as (a.k.a.) name of Santa Clara County Fire Department. The name was changed to more accurately reflect the area served and to avoid confusion between agencies with similar names in adjacent counties. In 2008, following a three-year administrative management agreement, the Saratoga Fire District entered into a full-service fire, rescue, and emergency medical agreement with County Fire. In September 2010 the Department annexed 32,000 acres of underserved area along the western edge of Santa Clara County into the Fire District. In 2013 the City of Morgan Hill did not renew its contract for services with Santa Clara County Fire Department.

Today the Santa Clara County Fire Department provides fire protection services to one of the most diverse areas in the state. Challenges range from high-rise buildings, downtown commercial areas, large retail malls and wildland–urban interface areas to industrial business centers, semi-conductor manufacturing with related hazardous materials and hi-tech systems. Services have evolved to include fire protection, community education, hazardous materials response, rescue, and advanced life support.

Governance 
Since 1947, the State Fire Protection District Law has been rewritten several times. The Department's authority is granted by the California Health and Safety Code, Div. 12, Part 2.7, and the Fire Protection District Law of 1987, also known as the Bergeson Fire District Law. The Department is governed by the Santa Clara County Board of Supervisors sitting as the Board of Directors. As such, the Department is classified as a dependent district. The Fire Chief is appointed by the Board of Supervisors, and is responsible for the proper administration of all affairs of the Department.

The Fire Chief consults with city/town managers to assure local matters are addressed. The Department takes great pride in the ability to be responsive to local issues and priorities. Fire codes and regulations are typically adopted at the local government level.

Historical Apparatus

Accomplishments

Services 
Fire prevention services were limited to land development and company inspection programs prior to 1978. The Department started the Fire Prevention Division in 1979, and took on the management role for the Santa Clara County Fire Marshal's Office in 1987.

The Department is a leader in emergency medical services. In 1974, members of Central Fire Protection District and the Campbell Fire Department participated in the first paramedic training program in northern California. The Campbell Fire Department established the first northern California fire department paramedic program that same year. EMT-1 level services were provided Department-wide in 1981, EMT-D in 1990, and first-responder paramedics in December 1995.

The Department advocates regional fire services. Hazardous materials regulation and response is a prime example of sharing scarce resources between multiple jurisdictions. In 1985, the California State Department of Health Services helped fund the basic training and equipping of the Department's regional hazardous materials response team. Since then the Department has continued to maintain a fully staffed dedicated hazardous materials team. In 2009, the Department applied to Cal OES for recognition as a Type I Hazardous Materials Response Team. After inspection by Cal OES to ensure the required equipment, staffing and training was in place, the team was awarded Type I status. The team is one of 29 Type I available throughout the State of California for mutual aid deployment.

Community education and preparedness programs provide the opportunity to educate children and adults about fire and injury prevention and train residents to become self-sufficient following a major disaster. The Department's program is staffed with five full-time employees, and is supported by on duty firefighting crews. The Department administers the Santa Clara County Office of Emergency Services and assists cities and towns in the methods to prepare and respond to all hazards. Emergency management services include developing written Emergency Operations Plans, Maintaining Emergency Operations Centers and on-going emergency management training for city and town employees.

The Department is one of the few fire agencies in the Bay Area to staff two full-time fire investigator positions, augmented by on-call personnel. Investigation of fires provides important information about the cause and origin of the local fire problem. The Fire Chief of the Santa Clara County Fire Department has traditionally served as the Local Mutual Aid Fire and Rescue Coordinator, also known as, the Operational Area Coordinator. This position has become increasingly pivotal in promoting and coordinating local government fire resources. Staffing levels, equipment, and water supplies have improved dramatically over the past decade, resulting in an improved ISO rating. In most of the communities served by the Department, business owners and residents enjoy a Class 2/8 fire insurance rating that was awarded in 1996.

In 2001, the Department established a Special Operations Task Force consisting of 45 employees trained in both technical rescue and hazardous materials response.

Personnel 
Employees of the Department believe in, and enjoy, a collaborative labor/management relationship. The relationship has produced a motivated workforce whose members enjoy excellent working conditions and numerous opportunities to work with management in the delivery of quality services. The non-adversarial approach to issues works to the benefit of all: management, labor, and the citizens served.

Department personnel have been actively involved in the development and maintenance of programs including safety equipment, apparatus design, physical fitness, station design, human relations, and strategic planning.

Department personnel take pride in a professional image. Perceptions of the organization play an important part in establishing and maintaining credibility with the public and allied emergency service providers.

Diversity, reflecting the communities served, offers strength and opportunity for the Department. A diverse workforce helps to plan and deliver services, with each team member offering a unique perspective.

Resources 
County Fire takes great pride in its fleet of emergency response apparatus. The vehicles incorporate state-of-the-art features. They are equipped and maintained to meet the variety of challenges presented by an urban and wildland urban interface service area. Apparatus are designed by committees composed of driver/operators, company officers, fire mechanics, and chief officers.

A computer network, which became operational in 1992, provides an information link in real-time to facilitate reporting and communications to all levels within the organization. It includes real-time fire weather reporting from two Remote Area Weather Stations (RAWS) located in the wildland/urban interface area.

Employee safety is a high priority. Employees are trained and equipped to work safely in a variety of emergency environments and situations. In 1981, the Department established a comprehensive wellness program that now includes routine medical screening, physical fitness screening, and employee assistance for Department members and their families.

Mobile data computers are being upgraded on all first-responder apparatus for use with mapping, routing, automatic vehicle location and unit status reporting.

Management 
The Santa Clara County Board of Supervisors sits as the Board of Directors for the Santa Clara County Fire Department. This relationship has been very successful in addressing the needs of local constituents for fire protection services. This single-service form of government has resulted in economies of scale and reduced bureaucracy.

The addition of a Business Manager in 1982, now titled Director of Business Services, has helped define the Department as an organization concerned with making good business decisions. Risk management, self-insurance, health benefit analysis, and fiscal partnerships have all become Department business practices.

The Department embraces a non-traditional enterprise philosophy. New markets, consolidations, contracts, customer services, regional approaches, and public/private partnerships are all strategies employed to enhance fire protection services. The Department concluded the self-assessment process for accreditation by the Commission on Fire Accreditation International (CFAI) in 2010. The Department is currently in the process of its third accreditation with an anticipated completion date of August 2015. The accreditation process includes: the development of a revised Strategic Plan, Standards of Cover document, and a Fire Department Self Assessment Manual.

The reaccreditation process will conclude with a peer assessor team site visit and the submittal of an accreditation report recommending accreditation status to the Commission on Fire Accreditation International (CFAI).

Operations

Battalion 72

Battalion 74

Battalion 83

Staffing

See also

Santa Clara County

References

External links 

Fire departments in California
Government of Santa Clara County, California